Julie Gerecht (born 28 November 1979) is a French sailor. She competed in the Yngling event at the 2008 Summer Olympics.

References

External links
 

1979 births
Living people
French female sailors (sport)
Olympic sailors of France
Sailors at the 2008 Summer Olympics – Yngling
Sportspeople from Paris
21st-century French women